Tragedy: The Story of Queensbridge is a 2005 documentary film directed by Booker Sim for Juju Films. The film documents the streets of the Queensbridge Housing Projects of New York City, following the issues and struggles of Tragedy Khadafi aka Intelligent Hoodlum. Queens rappers Havoc, Prodigy (both from the group Mobb Deep), Capone and N.O.R.E. (both from Capone-N-Noreaga), as well as producer Marley Marl among others appeared in the film.

Reception
At the review aggregator site Rotten Tomatoes, the film averaged an 80% approval rate. At the Internet Movie Database, 27 users gave a 7'8/10 media rating to the film.

External links

References 

2005 films
2005 documentary films
American documentary films
Documentary films about hip hop music and musicians
Documentary films about New York City
Films set in Queens, New York
Hood films
New York City hip hop
2000s English-language films
2000s American films